The Slaughter of Poultry Act 1967 was a piece of UK legislation that provided for the humane slaughter, for certain commercial purposes, of poultry. Exemptions were made for slaughter by kosher and by halal means.

References

United Kingdom Acts of Parliament 1967
History of agriculture in the United Kingdom
Kosher meat
Halal meat
Food law